Peter Takaaki Hirayama, (born March 31, 1924) is a Japanese prelate of the Catholic Church.

Hirayama was born in Seoul and was ordained a priest on March 19, 1957. Hirayama was appointed bishop of the Diocese of Oita on November 15, 1969 and was consecrated on January 25, 1970. Hirayama served in this capacity until his retirement on May 10, 2000

See also
Diocese of Oita

External links
Catholic-Hierarchy
Oita Diocese

20th-century Roman Catholic bishops in Japan
1924 births
Living people
Japanese expatriates in Korea
Japanese Roman Catholic bishops
University of Miyazaki alumni